Bacon is a 2014 album by Russian-American rock band Igor & the Red Elvises.

Track listing

Credits 

Adam Gust - Drums
Sarah Johnson - Flute, Saxophone
Garrett Morris - Drums
Oleg Schramm - Accordion, Keyboards, Organ
Dregas Smith - Vocals
Igor Yuzov - Bass, Guitar, Vocals
All songs by Igor Yuzov
Produced by Igor Yuzov
Recorded by Oleg "Schramm" Gorbunov at Cinque Ports, Venice CA, 2013

References

External links 
 

Red Elvises albums
2014 albums